The men's +93 kg competition in judo at the 1976 Summer Olympics in Montreal was held on 26 July at the Olympic Velodrome. The gold medal was won by Serhiy Novikov of the Soviet Union.

Results

Main brackets

Pool A

Pool B

Repechages

Repechage A

Repechage B

Finals

Final classification

References

External links
 

Judo at the 1976 Summer Olympics
Judo at the Summer Olympics Men's Heavyweight